DYCT (102.3 FM) was a radio station owned and operated by the Philippine Broadcasting Service. Its studios were located at the Leyte Provincial Sports Complex, Sta. Cruz St., Tacloban.

Profile
The station began broadcasting in November 2013 as Radyo ng Bayan Tacloban of following the aftermath of Typhoon Haiyan (Yolanda). It went off the air sometime in 2016. It is currently under the Department of Agriculture as an affiliate station. However, plans of reviving the station is put on hold due to stalled procurement process in the department.

References

Radio stations in Tacloban
News and talk radio stations in the Philippines
Philippine Broadcasting Service
Radio stations established in 2013
Radio stations disestablished in 2016
Defunct radio stations in the Philippines